The 2022 Austin mayoral election was held on November 8, 2022 to elect the next mayor of Austin, Texas. The election was nonpartisan; candidates' party affiliations did not appear on the ballot. Incumbent mayor Steve Adler was term-limited and could not run for re-election. In the general election, state representative Celia Israel and former mayor Kirk Watson took the first two spots, leading realtor Jennifer Virden and several other candidates. Because no candidate received more than 50% of the vote, the race proceeded to a runoff election between Israel and Watson on December 13, which Watson won with 886 votes—the narrowest margin in over two decades.

Due to the passage of Proposition D in 2021, which scheduled mayoral elections in Austin to coincide with presidential elections, the winner of this election will serve a shortened two-year term.

Background  
Though the election is officially nonpartisan, the runoff candidates, Celia Israel and Kirk Watson, are both affiliated with the Democratic Party. Jennifer Virden, who was third place, had a reputation of being conservative.

Steven Pedigo, director of UT's LBJ Urban Lab, indicated that Watson’s support was centralized with longtime residences of Austin in areas like the Northwest and Israel’s support was with younger demographics in growing and gentrifying areas of South and East Austin. According to Axios, Watson likely benefitted by the absence of Beto O’Rourke, who draws out younger and more progressive voters, from appearing on the runoff ballot. Furthermore, voters who supported more conservative Virden were more inclined to opt for Watson in the runoff.

Candidates

Declared 
 Craig Blanchard, business owner (Party affiliation: Democratic)
 Anthony Bradshaw, security guard
 Phil Campero Brual, Legislative intern and University of Texas at Austin government student
 Celia Israel, state representative from the 50th district (Party affiliation: Democratic)
 Gary Spellman, business owner
 Jennifer Virden, business owner and realtor
 Kirk Watson, former president pro tempore of the Texas Senate from the 14th district and former mayor (Party affiliation: Democratic)

Withdrew 
 Erica Nix, fitness instructor, performance artist, and LGBT activist (endorsed Israel)

Declined 
 Greg Casar, city councilor (running for U.S. House)
 Adam Loewy, attorney
 Kathie Tovo, city councilor

Endorsements

Results

References 

Austin mayoral
Austin
Mayoral elections in Austin, Texas